Magtens Korridorer is a band from Denmark which was started in 1995 in Copenhagen, Denmark. The band consists of Johan Olsen (vocals), Rasmus Kern (guitar, synth, samplers and other keys), Niklas Schneidermann (guitar), Terkel Møhl (bass) and Anders Ramhede (drums). The band's work is described as a mixture of rock and poetic post-punk.

History
The band made a demo tape in 1996, which included the song "Hestevisen", which was featured on the hugely popular DR P3 radio show Tæskeholdet. This instantly propelled the band to national stardom, despite not having recorded an album yet.

The band went to the studio and recorded their debut album Bagsiden Af Medaljen in 1998, but the album failed to make a commercial breakthrough. For the following seven years, not much was heard from the band and Terkel, Niklas and Anders joined the band. In 2005, Magtens Korridorer caught the attention of Karrierekanonen, a program for discovering new musical talents in Denmark. That year, the band released the album Friværdi, which was a commercial and critical success. Several singles were released such as "Lorteparforhold", "Picnic (på Kastellet)", "Nordhavn Station" and "Sara har..."

Frontman Olsen is also a Ph.D. in molecular biology, and he teaches at the University of Copenhagen.

Magtens Korridorer opened Orange Stage at the 2006 Roskilde Festival.

Johan Olsen hosted a radioshow on DR P3 during the summer of 2007 called "Summer School"

Discography

Albums

Live albums
2003: Magtens Korridorer i Humlebyen
2003: Stengade Live

EPs
1995: Intet nyt under solen
1996: Den første

Singles

External links

 Official website
 Myspace

References

Danish alternative rock groups
Musical groups established in 1995